Brisbane College of Advanced Education was a multi-campus Australian higher education institution (College of Advanced Education) from 1982 to 1990.

It was formed on 1 January 1982 with the amalgamation of the North Brisbane College of Advanced Education, Kelvin Grove College of Advanced Education, Mount Gravatt College of Advanced Education and the Brisbane Kindergarten Teachers College.

It was broken up in 1990 amidst wider reforms of Australian tertiary education: the Mount Gravatt campus was merged into Griffith University, while the Carseldine, Kedron Park and Kelvin Grove campuses merged into the Queensland University of Technology.

References

Defunct universities and colleges in Australia
Colleges of Advanced Education
Educational institutions established in 1982
Educational institutions disestablished in 1990
1982 establishments in Australia
1990 disestablishments in Australia